Bill Purcell was the York University hockey coach from 1965–1972, and the OIAA 1969–1970 Coach of the Year.

He is credited with establishing York University's Yeomen hockey program in 1961 and bringing it national acclaim and notoriety. He also championed the teams relocation from outdoor play at Glendon to the New York Arena, locally known as the Ice Palace.

Accomplishments
 1967–1968: 2nd-place finish in the Ontario Intercollegiate Athletic Association (OIAA) League
 1969–1970: OIAA championship
 1969–1970: Consolation title of the Canadian finals.
 1969–1970: Coach of the Year
 1971–1972: 1st-place finish in the Ontario Universities Athletic Association (OUAA) League with a record 16 wins (16-1-2)
 1978–1979: IHL Champion
 1981–1982: OUAA League Champion
 November 6, 2013:  Inducted into the Hockey Hall of Fame, Toronto

Coaching positions
 1978–1979: Head Coach Kalamazoo Wings of the IHL
 1979–1980: Head Coach Adirondack Red Wings of the AHL
 1980–1981: Head Coach Richmond Rifles of the Eastern Hockey League
 1981–1982: Coach University of Toronto Varsity Blues men's ice hockey team
 1989–1990: Head Coach Oshawa Legionaires of the MetJHL
 1994–1995: Assistant Coach Oshawa Generals of the OHL
 1995–1996: Assistant Coach Oshawa Generals of the OHL
 1996–1997: Head Coach Markham Waxers of the MetJHL
 2000–2001: Assistant Coach Tallahassee Tiger Sharks of the ECHL
 2004: Head Coach Whitby Dunlops
 2006–2008: coach of the Markham waxers
Purcell is a former semi-professional hockey player himself, playing for the Toronto All Stars 1966–1967.

He was a professional fire fighter for the city of Toronto (Dundas and Parliament hall) in the 1950s and 1960s.

References
http://www.excal.on.ca/sportshealth/hockeyalumni/
http://www.yorku.ca/sprtyork/sport_hall_of_fame/members/1984.htm

Ice hockey coaches
Living people
Academic staff of York University
Year of birth missing (living people)